Alex Donis (born 1964) is a queer Latinx visual artist.

Biography 
Donis was born in Chicago, Illinois. Donis attended California State University, Long Beach for his undergraduate degree, and obtained his graduate degree from Otis College of Art and Design in Los Angeles. His work is known, partially, for the many attempts to censor his exhibitions.

Notable art 
Donis' exhibition titled My Cathedral, was held at the Galeria de la Raza in San Francisco in 1997. The solo exhibition featured light-box paintings, including his painting titled, Jesus and Lord Rama (1997). This painting and another titled, Che Guevara and Cesar Chavez (1997) were destroyed in an act of vandalism at the exhibition. The destroyed paintings illustrated each of the two titled figures kissing each other, such as Jesus kissing the Hindu god, Lord Rama and Che Guevara kissing Cesar Chavez. In media reports, Donis stated that after the exhibition was vandalized, around 200 people from various different communities came together to have a discussion about homophobia.

Donis' 2001 solo exhibition at the Watts Towers Arts Center, in Los Angeles, was titled WAR. Donis was an art instructor at the Watts Towers Arts Center. In media reports, it was stated that the exhibition was removed due to threats of violence by local gang members. This claim was not proven. It seemed that a community group members found the content objectionable, "pornographic" and "too homoerotic". The images illustrated the war in Los Angeles between peace officers such as the Los Angeles Police Department and community youth perceived as gang affiliated. Images included Popeye and Captain McGill (2001), Officer Moreno and Joker (2001), Lucky Dice and Officer Gates (2001), and Young Crip, Young Blood (2001). When the exhibition was removed, and at the request of the artist, the Watts Towers Arts Center placed the following sign on the empty walls which read, "War is Cancelled". The removal of the exhibit sparked public outrage and news coverage, which caught the attention of the ACLU.  The exhibition was moved to the Frumkin/Duval Gallery in Santa Monica.

References

External links 
 http://www.alexdonis.com/

1964 births

Living people

American LGBT artists

Guatemalan American

Chicano

censorship